Wolfert may refer to:

People
Wolfert Acker (1667–1753), Colonial period American featured in Washington Irving's short story collection Wolfert's Roost and Miscellanies (1884)
Wolfert VI of Borselen (1433–1486), stadholder of Holland, Friesland, and Zeeland, Admiral of the Netherlands outside Flanders, and Lord of Veere
Wolfert Gerritse van Couwenhoven (1579–1662), founder of the New Netherland colony
Friedrich Hermann Wölfert (1850–1897), German publisher and aviation pioneer
Ira Wolfert (1908–1997), American Pulitzer Prize-winning war correspondent and author
Jeff Wolfert (born 1985), American football kicker
Jonathan M. Wolfert (born 1952), president of JAM Creative Productions Inc. in Dallas, Texas
Paula Wolfert (born 1938), American cookbook author
Sascha Wolfert (born 1990), German footballer

Places
Wolfert, New Jersey, an unincorporated community in Gloucester County, New Jersey, United States
Wolfert Tower, a town in Alb-Donau district, Baden-Württemberg, Germany

See also
Walford
Welford (disambiguation)
Wellford (disambiguation)
Wohlfahrt
Wolford
Wolfurt
Woolford (disambiguation)